Callionymus simplicicornis, the simple-spined dragonet, is a species of dragonet native to the tropical Pacific Ocean where it is known at depths of around .  This species grows to a length of  TL.

References

External links
 

S
Fish described in 1925